A Descant for Gossips is a 1983 Australian mini series about a school girl who becomes involved with two teachers. The adaptation is based on the novel of the same name by Australian author Thea Astley.

Cast

 Kaarin Fairfax - Vinny Lalor
 Geneviève Picot - Helen Striebel
 Peter Carroll - Robert Moller
 Louise Kan - Pearl
 Desiree Smith - Betty
 Steve Bastoni - Howard
 Keir Saltmarsh - Tommy
 Simon Chilvers - Mr. Findlay
 Anne Phelan - Mrs. Lalor
 Rona McLeod - Lillian
 Jennifer Jarman-Walker - Jess Talbot
 Rod Densley - Alex Talbot
 Kate Jason - Ruth Lunbeck
 Jeffrey Hodgson - Harold Lunbeck
 Jillian Murray - Marion Welch
 Bill Garner - Sam
 Rod Williams - Mr. Lalor
 Bruce Knappett - Mr. Jordan
 Les James - Mr. Farrelly
 Anne Charleston - Margaret
 Con Mathios - Royce
 Greg Stroud - Mike

References

External links

A Descant for Gossips at AustLit

English-language television shows
1980s Australian television miniseries
1983 Australian television series debuts
1983 Australian television series endings